John Mercer is the name of:
 Captain John Mercer (died 1756), colonial Virginia militiaman killed at the Battle of Great Cacapon
 John Mercer (colonial lawyer) (1704–1768), colonial Virginia lawyer
 John Francis Mercer (1759–1821), American Governor of Maryland, 1801–1803, son of the Virginia lawyer
 John H. Mercer (1922–1987), American Ohio State University glaciologist
 John Mercer (scientist) (1791–1866), British textile chemist
 John Mercer (Australian pastoralist) (1823–1891), Australian landowner, pastoralist and politician in colonial Victoria
 John Mercer (baseball) (1892–1982), American Major League Baseball first baseman
 John Mercer (archaeologist) (1934–1982), British archaeologist and author
 John Mercer (American politician) (born 1957), American legislator in the state of Montana
 John Mercer (photojournalist) (born 1949), New Zealand photographer and photojournalist
 Johnny Mercer (1909–1976), American songwriter
 Johnny Mercer (politician) (born 1981), British politician
 Jack Mercer (1910–1984), American animator and voice actor
 Jack Mercer (cricketer) (1893–1987), British cricketer for Glamorgan
 Jack Mercer (baseball) (1889–1945), Major League Baseball pitcher

See also
 John Mercer Langston (1829-1897), American abolitionist, attorney, educator, activist, diplomat, and politician